National Artist is an honorary title  issued by some states as a highest recognition of artists for their significant contributions to the cultural heritage of the nation. 

An equivalent title, People's Artist, has been known in countries of the former Eastern Bloc and is also commonly translated as "National Artist".

In Turkey, a similar title is called State Artist (:tr:Devlet Sanatçısı), which is also sometimes translated as "National Artist".

The following National Artist titles are known:
 Thailand National Artist
 National Artist of the Philippines
 National Artist of Azerbaijan
 National Artist of Malaysia

 
Honorary titles